Night Tide is a 1961 American independent fantasy film sometimes considered to be a horror film, written and directed by Curtis Harrington and featuring Dennis Hopper in his first starring role. It was filmed in 1960, premiered in 1961, but was held up from general release until 1963. The film's title was inspired by some lines from Edgar Allan Poe's poem "Annabel Lee". The film was released by American International Pictures as a double feature with The Raven.

Plot
Johnny Drake, a sailor on shore leave in Santa Monica, meets a young woman named Mora in a local jazz club. Mora tells him that she makes her living on the pier appearing as a mermaid in a sideshow attraction under the name 'Mora the Mermaid', a 'half-woman, half-fish', on the boardwalk, operated by Captain Murdock. She lives in an apartment above the amusement park that houses the merry-go-round. He goes to see her in her mermaid costume at the pier. Mora tells Johnny that Captain Murdock is her godfather and he found her as an orphan living on the Greek island of Mykonos. Captain Murdock refers to her as his 'ward'. Johnny becomes acquainted with the merry-go-round operator and his daughter Ellen, who warns Johnny that Mora may be dangerous, as her two previous boyfriends both drowned under mysterious circumstances.

As Mora and Johnny become closer, Mora tells him that she believes she is a siren, one of the legendary creatures who lure sailors to their deaths under the influence of the moon. Johnny witnesses Mora being followed by a mysterious black-clad woman, the 'Sea Witch' whom she believes is one of the sirens, calling her to return to the sea to fulfill her destiny. However, Johnny does not believe that Mora is capable of killing anyone, and thinks she must be suffering from a delusion. During a scuba dive on the day of the full moon, Mora cuts Johnny's air hose, apparently attempting to drown him. He is forced to the surface. She swims out to sea and disappears.

Johnny is devastated, but returns to the boardwalk the following evening and goes to the sideshow, where he finds Captain Murdock at the entrance as usual. Peering into the mermaid tank, he sees Mora's corpse on display. Captain Murdock appears brandishing a gun, admitting to Johnny that he killed Mora's boyfriends because he could not bear the thought of her leaving him. Murdock fires at Johnny, but misses. The gunshots attract the attention of two policemen on the boardwalk, and Murdock and Johnny are taken into custody.

At the police station, Murdock confesses, saying he found and adopted Mora when she was a young orphan. He planted the idea that she was a mermaid, incapable of living the life of a normal woman, in her head as a way of binding her to him forever. When she matured and began to attract male attention, Murdock murdered the men she grew close to and let Mora think that she had caused their deaths. However, Murdock denies any knowledge of the strange figure Mora believed to be a siren.

As Johnny's shore leave ends, Ellen, who has taken an interest in him, visits the police station to bid him goodbye. He tells her that he will try to return in the future.

Production

Development
Harrington sold his original script, called The Girl from Beneath the Sea, to Roger Corman in 1956. According to Spencer Kansa, Harrington based his script on a self-penned story titled "The Secrets of the Sea." Kansa states that prior to filming the director had turned down an offer from the Mickey Cohen gang to finance the picture. "They were very charming men but I had visions that if the film didn't do well I'd end up at the bottom of the LA river in a block of cement!"

The mermaid mural for the sideshow attraction in which Mora stars was painted for the film by Paul Mathison. Mathison was an associate of Cameron's, who had been part of her magical circle with Jack Parsons, starred as Pan in Kenneth Anger's film Inauguration of the Pleasure Dome and also costumed Cameron and dressed the set for Harrington's 1956 short documentary on Cameron, The Wormwood Star. According to Spencer Kansa, the mural "if you look closely hides a clue to the finale of the picture." Mathison can be seen in the opening Jazz club scene, sporting a blonde buzz cut.

Another patron of the Jazz club where jazz flautist Paul Horn and his band play is Barbette, the famous trapeze artist and star of Jean Cocteau's seminal surrealist short film Blood of a Poet.

Cast
 Dennis Hopper as Johnny Drake
 Linda Lawson as Mora
 Gavin Muir as Capt. Samuel Murdock
 Luana Anders as Ellen Sands
 Marjorie Eaton as Madame Romanovitch
 Tom Dillon as Merry-Go-Round Operator - Ellen's Grandfather
 H.E. West as Lt. Henderson
 Ben Roseman as Bruno
 Marjorie Cameron as the Water Witch (credited as Cameron)
Paul Horn as jazz saxophonist (uncredited)
Joe Gordon as jazz trumpeter (uncredited)
Jimmy Bond as jazz bassist (uncredited)
Kenny Dennis as jazz drummer (uncredited)

The role of Mora the Mermaid (played by Lawson) was originally to be played by Susan Harrison, who had been the lead in Sweet Smell of Success (1957). Harrison, at the time a friend of director Harrington, initially agreed to take the role, but then reneged due to a personal relationship.

Harrington had previously worked with actress Cameron; his 1956 short (10-minute) documentary The Wormwood Star (viewable on YouTube) is about Cameron and her artwork.

Filming
In order to film some of the underwater sequences in Night Tide, director Curtis Harrington gave detailed instructions to a cameraman who then shot the scenes underwater at the director's request.

The film was produced by Aram Kantarian. The cinematographers were Vilis Lapenieks and Floyd Crosby.

Release and reception
Night Tide premiered at the Spoleto Film Festival in Spoleto, Italy in July 1961, where it was named the top American film that year. The film's production company, Virgo, defaulted on their Pathé Lab loan of $33,793 and Pathé was preparing to foreclose on the picture. Roger Corman asked the lab to hold off on their legal actions to allow Filmgroup to distribute the film, guaranteeing Pathé $15,000 within 12 months of the film's release. Pathé agreed, and Filmgroup released it through American International Pictures. It was given a general theatrical release in the United States two years after its initial premiere, opening in Detroit on February 13, 1963. It later screened in New York City on May 25, 1964.

Dennis Hopper stated in an interview that the film was made for $28,000 and...

The entry for the film in Horror: The Aurum Film Encyclopedia states "Clearly inspired by Cat People (1942), following Val Lewton's principles by having a vividly realistic setting (the tawdry pier and funfairs) and providing a rational explanation for most of the mystery (the girl's adoptive father planted the siren story in her mind), it is both clumsy and tentative and strikingly atmospheric. More of a fantasy than a horror movie perhaps, the film does make darkly minatory use of its dream sequences (the mermaid nightmarishly metamorphosing into an octopus) and the recurrent motif of the mysterious woman in black whose appearances frighten the girl."

Legacy
The film was restored by the Academy Film Archive in 2007.
Nicholas Winding Refn is a fan of the film to the point of restoring it as well.

Musical
A musical theater adaptation with music by Nathania Wibowo and book and lyrics by Taylor Tash was featured in the 2017 New York Musical Theatre Festival and premiered at the Towle Theater in Hammond, Indiana during its 2021 season.

References

Sources

External links

 
 
 
 
 
 Official trailers
 Night Tide on byNWR

1961 films
1960s horror thriller films
1960s psychological thriller films
American horror thriller films
American psychological thriller films
American black-and-white films
1960s English-language films
Films about mermaids
Films directed by Curtis Harrington
Films scored by David Raksin
American International Pictures films
1960s American films
1961 independent films
American independent films